Despite the influx of millions of Syrian refugees that exacerbated poverty, Turkey has made significant progress in reducing poverty.

Following the increase in GDP per capita of 158% during 2000-2015, poverty incidence decreased from 44% to 18% between 2002 and 2014. In the same period, incidence of extreme poverty declined from 13% to 3% of the population.

Causes of poverty 

 Low female labor force participation. Gender inequalities persist in access to economic opportunities and the female labor participation remains very low. Turkey ranked 130 out of 145 countries in the Global Gender Gap rankings. Female participation in the workplace has been increasing as a percentage and are forecasted to increase in a sustained way as Turkey transitions towards a high-income economy.

 Low productivity in the agriculture sector. Agriculture employs about 20% of the working population in Turkey with a very low labor productivity, which translates into limited earnings potential. While the Turkish agriculture remains the largest producer of hazelnut, cherry, figs, apricot, and quince in the world, the average size of farms at 2 ha is very low and discourages investment opportunities.

 Low national savings rate and low FDI. Having a very low domestic savings rate, Turkey is dependent on capital inflows to finance its structural current account deficit. Despite its dependence on outside financing, Turkey attracts very little FDI — on average US$12.75 billion per year during 2003-15.

 Exposure to natural disasters. Over 2 million Turks and more than 6% of Turkey's GDP are exposed to disasters at any given year — ranking 9th globally with respect to  GDP exposure to earthquakes — because of Turkey's high risk of earthquakes, flooding, forest fires and avalanches.

Poverty alleviation measures 

 Establishment of universal health coverage in 2003. 

 Seismic risk reduction program. Turkey pioneered a seismic mitigation and emergency preparedness project that has been a model internationally. The program — which started in 2006 — addresses the vulnerability of public buildings through creating development standards and third-party review.

 Turkey's risk insurance scheme for private property — established in 1999 — is considered to be a proactive and world-class example that other countries imitate. However, the insurance program does not have differentiating tariffs that could provide incentives for disaster-resistant construction.

 Plans to increase investments in R&D. Despite spending 1% of GDP on R&D and with plans to increase it to 1.8% of GDP, Turkey compares poorly to OECD countries in science and innovation indicators. Turkey’s share of patents registered in the European Patent Office was only 0.26%, better than Poland's 0.23% but much worse than Denmark's 1.22% and Belgium's 1.31%.

Further reading 
 
 Atun, R., S. Aydin, S. Chakraborty, S. Sumer, M. Aran, I. Gurol, S. Nazlioglu, S. Ozgulcu, U. Aydogan, B. Ayar, U. Dilmen, and R. Akdag. “Universal Health Coverage in Turkey: Enhancement of Equity.” The Lancet. 2013. 
 Azevedo, J. P., Judy S. Yang, and Osman Kaan Inan. “What Are the Impacts of Syrian Refugees on Host Community Welfare in Turkey?” Policy Research Working Paper 7542, World Bank, Washington, DC. 2016. 
 Bozoghu, M., and V. Ceyhan. 2007. “Measuring the technical efficiency and exploring the inefficiency determinants of vegetable farms in Samsun, Turkey”. Agricultural System. Vol 94: 2007 pp. 649-656.
 Creating Good Jobs. Forthcoming. Washington, DC: World Bank.
 Cuberes, D., and Marc Teignier. “How Costly Are Labor Gender Gaps? Estimates for the Balkans and Turkey.” Policy Research Working Paper Series 7319, World Bank, Washington, DC. 2015. 
 Cuevas, Facundo, and A. Acar. “Poverty Measurement in Turkey: A Review of Data, Methods, and Challenges”. Working Paper, World Bank, Washington, DC. 2016. 
 Cuevas, Facundo, and L. Rodriguez-Chamussy. “Poverty, Shared Prosperity and Inequality in Turkey: What is Behind the Trends?” Working Paper, World Bank, Washington, DC. 2016.
 Del Carpio, Ximena, and Mathis Wagner. 2015. “The Impact of Syrian Refugees on the Turkish Labor Market.” Policy Research Working Paper Series 7402, World Bank, Washington, DC.
 Dilli, B., and Kari Nyman. 2015. Turkey's Energy Transitions: Milestones and Challenges. Washington, DC: World Bank.
 Hentschel, J., Meltem Aran, Raif Can, Francisco Ferreira, Jeremie Gignoux, and Arzu Uraz. Life Chances in Turkey: Expanding Opportunities for the Next Generation. World Bank. 2010. 
 Hirshleifer S, D. McKenzie, R. Almeida, and C Ridao-Cano. “The Impact of Vocational Training for the Unemployed. Experimental Evidence from Turkey”. Policy Research Working Paper 6807. World Bank, Washington, DC. 2014. 
 Hohberg, M. and J Lay. 2015. “The impact of minimum wages on informal and formal labor market outcomes: evidence from Indonesia”. IZA Journal of Labor & Development, 4 (1), pp. 1–25.
 Kasnakoglu, Haluk and Erol H. Cakmak. “Agriculture and Poverty in Turkey: Issues, Challenges, Prospects”. SCD Background Paper. Turkey. 2016. 
 Ministry of Forestry and Water Affairs. “Assessment of Climate Change Impact on Water Resources”. General Directorate of Water Management, Turkey. 2016. 
 Mudabi, R. “Location, Control and Innovation in Knowledge-Intensive Industries.” Journal of Economic Geography 8 (5). 2008: pp. 699–725.
 Nguyen, H., Ayberk Yilmaz, and Temel Taskin. “Resource Misallocation in Turkey.” Policy research Working Paper No.7780. World Bank, Washington, DC. 2016. 
 Rise of the Anatolian Tigers: Turkey Urbanization Review. Washington, DC: World Bank. 2015. 
 Supply and Demand for Child Care Services in Turkey: A Mixed Methods Study. Washington, DC: World Bank.
 Turkey 2015 Report. Commission Staff Working Document, EU Enlargement Strategy. 2015.
 Turkey: Institutional Review of Energy Efficiency. Washington, DC: World Bank. 2015. 
 Turkey Transitions: Integration, Inclusion and Institutions. Washington, DC: World Bank. 2014. 
 Turkey's Energy Transition- Milestones and Challenges. Washington, DC: World Bank. 2015.
 Turkey's Response to the Syrian Refugee Crisis and the Road Ahead. Washington, DC: World Bank. 2015
 Zenginobuz, E. Ü. 2008 “On Regulatory Agencies in Turkey and Their Independence.” Turkish Studies 9 (3): pp. 475–505.

References